George Ka Pakistan (George'sPakistan) was a Pakistani reality show broadcast on Geo TV in 2005. The show revolves around George Fulton, a British journalist who has three months to become a Pakistani. The show is considered one of South Asia's first original reality TV shows.

External links
Geo TV Homepage 
Guardian article

Pakistani television series
Geo TV original programming
2005 Pakistani television series debuts